Corazones sin rumbo (English title: Hearts aimlessly) is a Mexican telenovela produced by Valentín Pimstein for Televisa in 1980.

Is an adaptation of the soap opera La mesera produced in 1963.

Cast 
Carlos Piñar as Manuel
Blanca Guerra as Magda
Beatriz Aguirre as Lorenza
Silvia Caos as Concha
Carmelita González as Rocio
Rebeca Manriquez as Leonor
Rocio Chazaro as La Chata
Manuel Saval as Jorge
Víctor Alcocer as Esteban
Lola Tinoco as Chole
Humberto Cabañas as Taruffi
José Flores as Pepe
Raúl Ortiz as Paquito
Eloisa Capilla as Chabela
Florencio Castello as Don José
Jesus Gómez as Angel
Antonio Castro as Carlos
Ernesto Casillas as Cura
Roy de la Serna as Sr.Pittman

References

External links 

Mexican telenovelas
1980 telenovelas
Televisa telenovelas
Spanish-language telenovelas
1980 Mexican television series debuts
1980 Mexican television series endings